Trivandrum Developmental Screening Test (TDSC) is a developmental screening test for children. It was developed by selecting 17 test items from BSID (Baroda Norms).

History
It was developed and designed at the Child Development Centre, SAT Hospital, Government Medical College, Trivandrum, Kerala in 1991.

Test 
It was validated both at the hospital and the community level against the standard Denver Developmental Screening Test.

With a sensitivity of 66.7% and specificity of 78.8%, it can be used even by community level health worker for mass screening and takes around 5 minutes to complete.[2]Includes adequate mental and motor development milestones spread over the first 2 years. Requires only a pencil and a bunch of keys as test items.

See also
 Baroda Development Screening Test
 Denver Developmental Screening Test
 Goodenough–Harris Draw-A-Person Test

References

Pediatrics
Medical assessment and evaluation instruments